MTV Rock N' Jock is a television series on MTV featuring actors, musicians, and other entertainers playing sports with professional athletes. The original episode was called The MTV Rock N' Jock Diamond Derby, and was changed to MTV's Rock N' Jock Softball Challenge, in year 2. The concept expanded to include basketball in 1991, football in 1997 and bowling in 1999
The game was an annual feature (with multiple reruns of most episodes) for many years on MTV.

The original announcers were professional sportscaster, Steve Albert and comedian Ken Ober who provided color commentary. Bill Bellamy and MTV Sports host Dan Cortese initially participated as players and then as coaches in later years.

The fourth annual Rock N' Jock B-Ball Jam was nominated for the Daytime Emmy Award for Outstanding Game Show in 1995, losing to Jeopardy!.

Partial list of shows

MTV's First Annual Rock N' Jock Diamond Derby (1990)
 Location: Dedeaux Field, USC, Los Angeles, CA
 Date: Sunday, January 21, 1990
 Team names: Aardvarks, Salamanders
 Team coaches: Sam Kinison (Aardvarks), Sammy Hagar (Salamanders)
 Announcers: Steve Albert, Ken Ober
Sideline Reporters: Martha Quinn, Kevin Seal, Downtown Julie Brown, Jim Turner
National Anthem: Steve Vai

Aardvarks
 Eddie Murray (1B) Baseball Player, Baltimore Orioles, 2003 Hall of Fame
 Bret Michaels (2B) Musician, Lead Singer of Poison
 Barry Larkin (SS) Baseball Player, Cincinnati Reds, 2012 Hall of Fame
 Corbin Bernsen (3B) Actor, Major League trilogy
 Mark McGwire (RF) Baseball Player, Oakland A's (583 home runs)
 Belinda Carlisle (RCF) Musician, Lead Singer, The Go-Go's
 Howard Johnson (LCF) Baseball Player, NY Mets
 MC Hammer (LF) Rapper/Dancer, 3x Grammy Award winner
 Tom Petersson Musician, Bass Player, Cheap Trick
 Roger McDowell (P) Baseball Player, NY Mets, 1986 World Series Champion
 Lou Gramm (DH) Musician, Foreigner, 2013 Songwriters Hall of Fame
 David Faustino Actor, Married With Children
 Brian Robbins Actor, Head of the Class
 Keanu Reeves Actor, Bill & Ted's Excellent Adventure
 Pam Wright Contest winner

Salamanders
 Wally Joyner (1B), Baseball Player, California Angels, All-Star
 Tone Loc (2B), Rapper, Wild Thing (Tone Loc song) and Funky Cold Medina
 Shawon Dunston (SS), Baseball Player, Chicago Cubs, 2x All-Star
 Kevin Costner (3B) Actor, Dances With Wolves 2x Academy Award winner
 Darryl Strawberry (RF) Baseball Player, NY Mets, 1986 World Series Champion
 Kip Winger (RCF) Musician, Winger (band)
 Rafael Palmeiro (LCF) Baseball Player, Texas Rangers
 Steven Adler (LF) Musician, Drummer, Guns N' Roses, Rock N Roll Hall of Fame 2012
 Bruce Hornsby (C) Musician, 3x Grammy Award winner
 Mark Langston (P) Baseball Player, California Angels, 4x All-Star
 Robert Wuhl Actor/Writer, Arliss
 Holly Robinson Peete Actor, 21 Jump Street
 Robin Zander Musician, Lead Singer, Cheap Trick
 Mike Lookinland Actor, "Bobby Brady" on The Brady Bunch
 Rick Caraballo Contest winner

MTV's First Annual Rock N' Jock B-Ball Jam (1991)
 Location: Gersten Pavilion, Loyola Marymount University, CA
 Date: Sunday, September 15, 1991
 Team names: Bricklayers, Violators
 Team coaches: Craig T. Nelson (Bricklayers), Magic Johnson (Violators)
 Announcers: Steve Albert, Ken Ober
PA Announcer: Lawrence Tanner
Referee: Hue Hollins Officiated 19 NBA Finals & 5 NBA All-Star games
Sideline Reporters: Kari Wuhrer, Downtown Julie Brown
Halftime Performer: Marky Mark and the Funky Bunch, Loleatta Holloway, "Good Vibrations"
Slam Dunk Contest: Mark Wahlberg
3pt Contest: Will Smith (5 of 15)
Mascots: The Hornet, Phoenix Gorilla

 Bricklayers
 Mark Wahlberg Actor/Rapper, Boogie Nights (28pts)
 Morris Chestnut Actor, Boyz n the Hood (Co-MVP/50 points)
 Robert Wuhl Actor/Writer, Arliss, Bull Durham
 John Salley (Center/Power Forward) Detroit Pistons, 4x NBA Champion
 Flea Musician/Bass Player, Red Hot Chili Peppers
 Dan Majerle (Small Forward) Phoenix Suns, 3x All-Star
 Luke Perry Actor, Beverly Hills 90210
 Kurt Rambis (Power Forward) LA Lakers, 4x NBA Champion
 Jaleel White Actor, Urkel on Family Matters
 Billy Wirth Actor, The Lost Boys
 Spud Webb (Point Guard) Atlanta Hawks

 Violators
 Magic Johnson(Point Guard/Shooting Guard) LA Lakers, 12x All-Star, Hall of Fame
 Reggie Miller (Shooting Guard) Indiana Pacers, 5x All-Star, Hall of Fame (Co-MVP/76pts)
 Will Smith Actor/Rapper, The Fresh Prince of Bel-Air, 4x Grammy winner
 Vlade Divac (Center) LA Lakers, Hall of Fame
 Donnie Wahlberg Actor/Musician, New Kids On The Block (9pts)
 Ron Harper (Point Guard) LA Clippers, 5x NBA Champion
 Michael Bivins Singer/Rapper, New Edition, Bell Biv Devoe
 Corin Nemec Actor, Parker Lewis Can't Lose
 MC Lyte Rapper/Actor, First solo female rapper to release a full album

Score: Bricklayers 180 > Violators 173

MTV's Second Annual Rock N' Jock Softball Challenge (1991)
 Location: Dedeaux Field, USC, Los Angeles, CA
 Date: Saturday, January 12, 1991

MTV's Second Annual Rock N' Jock B-Ball Jam (1992)

MTV's Third Annual Rock N' Jock Softball Challenge (1992)

MTV's Third Annual Rock N' Jock B-Ball Jam (1993)

MTV's Fourth Annual Rock N' Jock Softball Challenge (1994)
 Location: Blair Field, Long Beach, CA
 Date: Saturday, January 23, 1993
 Team names: Homeboys, Awayboys
 Team coaches: Corbin Bernsen (Homeboys), Dan Cortese (Awayboys)

 Homeboys
 Corbin Bernsen (#7, SS), actor
 Chuck D (#1, LF), musician, Public Enemy
 Ken Griffey Jr. (#24, LCF), Baseball Player
 Jose Canseco (#33, 1B), Baseball Player
 Jon Bon Jovi (#5, 2B), Musician, Lead Singer, Bon Jovi
 Gary Sheffield (#10, 3B), Baseball Player
 Treach (#118, C), musician, Naughty By Nature
 Brady Anderson (#9, RF), Baseball Player
 Scott Ian (#15, RCF), musician, Anthrax
 Dwight Gooden (#16, P), Baseball Player
 David Bryan (#11, 1B), musician, Bon Jovi
 Richie Sambora (#3, OF), musician, Bon Jovi
 Flavor Flav (#911, RF/P), musician, Public Enemy

 Awayboys 
 Dan Cortese (#00, SS), MTV Host
 Bret Michaels (#58, C), musician, Poison
 David Justice (#23, RF), Baseball Player
 Michael Richards (#8, LF), actor, Seinfeld
 Frank Thomas (#35, 1B), Baseball Player
 Barry Bonds (#25, LCF), Baseball Player
 Dweezil Zappa (#22, RCF), musician
 Robin Ventura (#23, 3B) Baseball Player
 Salt (Cheryl James) (#54, 2B), musician, Salt-n-Pepa
 Pepa (Sandy Denton) (#68, 2B), musician, Salt-n-Pepa
 Spin (Deidre Roper) (#7, 2B), musician, Salt-n-Pepa
 Roger McDowell (#31, P), Baseball Player
 Billy Ragsdale (#5, IF/OF), actor

MTV's Fourth Annual Rock N' Jock B-Ball Jam (1994)
 Team names: Violators, Bricklayers
 Team coaches: Bill Bellamy (Violators), Dan Cortese (Bricklayers)

MTV's Fifth Annual Rock n' Jock Softball Challenge (1994)
 Location: Blair Field, Long Beach, CA
 Date: Saturday, January 15, 1994
 Team names: Homeboys, Awayboys
 Team coaches: Norman Fell (Homeboys), Tom Arnold (Awayboys)

MTV's Fifth Annual Rock N' Jock B-Ball Jam (1995)
 Team names: Violators, Bricklayers
 Team coaches: Bill Bellamy (Violators), Dan Cortese (Bricklayers)

MTV's Sixth Annual Rock N' Jock Softball Challenge (1995)
 Team names: Homeboys, Awayboys
 Team coaches: Dan Cortese (Homeboys), Bill Bellamy (Awayboys)

MTV's Seventh Annual Rock N' Jock Softball Challenge (1996)

MTV's Sixth Annual Rock N' Jock B-Ball Jam (1996)
 Team names: Violators, Bricklayers
 Team coaches: Bill Bellamy (Violators), Dean Cain (Bricklayers)

MTV's Eighth Annual Rock N' Jock Softball Challenge (1997)

MTV's Seventh Annual Rock N' Jock B-Ball Jam (1997)
 Team names: Violators, Bricklayers
 Team coaches: Shaquille O'Neal (Violators), Bill Walton (Bricklayers)

MTV's Rock N' Jock Super Bowl II (1998)

MTV Rock N' Jock Bowling Ball  (1999)
 Musical Guests: Method Man & Redman, New Radicals

MTV's Tenth Annual Rock N' Jock Softball Challenge (1999)

MTV Rock N' Jock Bowling II (2000)

MTV Rock N' Jock Basebrawl (2001)

References

1989 American television series debuts
Rock music television series
American sports television series
1990s American music television series